Dieter Aschenborn (15 November 1915 in Okahandja, Namibia – September 2002 in Windhoek, Namibia) was a Namibian painter. He was the son of the animal painter Hans Aschenborn.

Biography
At the age of six, he moved with his family from Namibia (at that time South West Africa) to Stellenbosch in South Africa and shortly thereafter to Kiel, Germany. Later, Dieter Aschenborn returned to South Africa to work as a farmer. In the second World War, he was interned. After the war, Aschenborn became the first game warden of the Etosha National Park till 1952. In the park he developed his leather paintings which earned him a reputation in Southern Africa. He moved to Windhoek, and he was able from now on to live entirely from his art.

Aschenborn is especially known as an animal painter of African wildlife. He made himself also a name with drawings and sculptures, especially reliefs cut out of wood, which together with murals of his decorate several public buildings in Namibia. He also designed postage stamps for Namibia. He also painted on leather and parchment.

Dieter's son Uli Aschenborn is also an artist.

Exhibitions

Solo
 1966 Bloemfontein (South Africa)

Group
 1965 "Three generations Aschenborn", Municipal Building, Windhoek
 1968 Schloss Kranichstein, Darmstadt, Germany
 1968 Interfauna "Im Reich der Tiere", Düsseldorf, Germany
 1983 "Namibian Artists" University of Pretoria, South Africa
 1992 "Eight and a half Aschenborn", Kendzia Galerie, Windhoek
 2004 "Three Aschenborn", Kendzia Galerie, Windhoek

References
 Roos, Nico (1978) Art in South-West Africa; pp. 16, 22,60, 137, 
 Aschenborn, Dieter (1989) Aschenborn,

Sources

20th-century German painters
20th-century German male artists
German male painters
Namibian painters
1915 births
2002 deaths
White Namibian people
Namibian people of German descent
German emigrants to South Africa